In astronomical imaging and Earth imaging, the crater illusion, also known as the dome illusion or crater/dome illusion, is an optical illusion which causes impact craters and other depressions to appear raised as domes or mountains. It is believed to be caused by our being accustomed to seeing light from overhead. When some images are taken from orbit, the light from the sun is nearly horizontal.  This is the only time shadows are seen.  Our brains are tricked into thinking that the interior of the crater is above the surrounding terrain instead of below it.

Examples
In September 2015, NASA released an image from the space probe Dawn of the crater Occator on dwarf planet Ceres. Because of the position of the Sun at the time the image was taken, the walls of the crater may appear to be convex instead of concave.  On the right is the same image rotated 180 degrees to change the position of the shadows and eliminate the illusion. In December 1968, the Apollo 8 mission took the photograph on the right of the Moon's crater Goclenius.  On the left is the same image rotated in an attempt to create the illusion.

In March 2011, NASA released an image of Mercury's Spitteler and Holberg craters taken by the MESSENGER spacecraft.  The image on the left is the original image and the image on the right is the same image rotated in an attempt to remove the illusion.

In the image on the left of the Tin Bider crater produced by NASA Earth Observatory's EO-1-based Advanced Land Imager produces a reverse illusion.  The crater rises above the surrounding terrain, however the position of the sun makes it appear to be below it.

References

External links
The Dome Illusion!
Lunar Craters inverting Illusion
Crater Optical Illusion

Optical illusions
Impact craters
Space photography and videography